Carmel Valley is a suburban planned community in the northwestern corner of San Diego, California, United States. The community is composed of commercial offices, residential units, hotels, retail stores and restaurants.

History

Ahwel-Awa 
Native American Kumeyaay history within the area has been documented to 7,000 years ago, which was adjacent to a Kumeyaay village west of El Camino Real near the San Dieguito River in North City at the time of European contact with the Spanish known as Ahwel-Awa or ‘aqwilawa, meaning "twine house". The Portolá expedition in 1769, described it as "a large village... and many well built houses with grass roofs". The village were referred to various names by the Spanish such as Sellegua or Jellegua, and were given Christian names under Spanish rule such as San Jacome De la Marca, La Poza de Ozuna, or San Dieguito (name for the region).

Ahwel-Awa was the ancestral home of the Kwitlp clan of the Ipai-Kumeyaay people who spoke the Ipai dialect, and were one of the first Kumeyaay clans to convert to Catholicism in 1770's under the leadership of Jamacuain "Benito" Culip, who was the kwaapay (leader) of the clan.

Cordero 
After the Mexican War of Independence, the area was known to locals as Cordero as land grants were distributed to rancheros to promote settlement and dispossessed many local Kumeyaay peoples of their rights to the land. The Kwitlp clan were relocated inland into what is today, the Mesa Grande Band of Diegueno Mission Indians under the Quilp surname. The name Cordero comes from men with this surname who settled in the area in 1770s (Joaquin Ignacio, Francisco, Mariano Antonio, the sources also contain references to "Cordero brothers" that participated in the Portolá expedition), a ranch house owned by one or more of them was located to the east of El Camino Real and south of Carmel Valley Road.

Following the Mexican-American War and the California Gold rush, the area developed to support agriculture and horse farms. Some equestrian facilities remain in the area.

Carmel Valley 
The name Carmel Valley comes from the Catholic Sisters of Mercy, who in 1905 had established a dairy farm (Mercy Hospital Farm) and monastery in the lower McGonigle Canyon. The Sisters of Mercy had named a nearby hill Mount Carmel after a Biblical place near Jerusalem when they came to San Diego in 1890s and were given 1,000 acres in the area by the McGonigle family in exchange for health care (Sisters established the Mercy Hospital). When Robert Stevens acquired the farm in 1940s, he changed its name to Mount Carmel Ranch; the name Carmel got attached to the valley, at first starting with the lower portion of the McGonigle Canyon. Sisters of Mercy had also established the Carmel Valley Cemetery in 1900 (to the north of the modern SR 56).

Carmel Valley is one of the newer neighborhoods of the City of San Diego, California. The community was formed by the City of San Diego on February 1, 1975. The construction later began in 1983 as farms were replaced by residential communities. Although the area was known locally as Carmel Valley, in 1974 the area was given the institutional name North City West in the master plan. The name Carmel Valley was adopted by residents in 1991 to replace the old one.

Geography
Carmel Valley is bordered to the north by the North City Future Urbanizing Area (NCFUA) and Pacific Highlands Ranch; to the south by Los Peñasquitos Canyon Preserve and Torrey Hills; to the east by Pacific Highlands Ranch and Del Mar Mesa; and to the west by Interstate 5 and Torrey Pines. Nearby is the Torrey Pines State Natural Reserve, where one of two stands of the endangered Torrey Pine is found to occur. The area overlooks the ocean and is located in the hills.

While many people in the area are now referring to the entire 92130 ZIP code as Carmel Valley, the actual boundaries of the community remain unchanged from the original community plan. The remainder of the 92130 ZIP code is filled by the surrounding communities of Del Mar Mesa, Pacific Highlands Ranch, and Torrey Hills. Torrey Highlands, the easternmost section of Del Mar Mesa, is considered to be a part of Carmel Valley and the boundary between Carmel Valley and Rancho Peñasquitos.

Demographics
According to the San Diego County Assessor's Office's 2006 estimates, there were 42,047 people living in the neighborhood, a 49.2% increase from 2000. The racial makeup of the neighborhood was 70.6% White, 18.0% Asian & Pacific Islander, 7.0% Hispanic, 3.4% from other races, 0.89% African American, and 0.001% American Indian.

The neighborhood is diverse in age with 30.2% under 18 and 6.5% over 65. The median age was 36.6. There were 2.7 persons per household. The annual median household income was $120,886.

According to the United States Census Bureau, as accessed from the American FactFinder website, the total population of the 92130 area code in the 2010 census was 48,940 with a 5-year estimate of 51,757 in 2016.

There are very low crime rates and a very small homeless population within the community.

Education 

Carmel Valley has an overlay of various school districts. For the elementary schools, the northern section is part of the Solana Beach School District (K-6). The southern section is managed by the Del Mar Union School District (K-6). Overlaying the entire community, the San Dieguito Union High School District manages the middle schools and high schools. Some Carmel Valley residents attend schools in the bordering communities of Pacific Highlands Ranch, Torrey Hills, and Torrey Pines. Carmel Valley schools are known for outstanding education and rigorous academics.

Elementary schools 

 Ashley Falls (Del Mar Union School District)
 Carmel Creek (Solana Beach School District)
 Carmel Del Mar (Del Mar Union School District)
 Del Mar Pines (private, nonsectarian)
 Ocean Air (Del Mar Union School District)
 Sage Canyon (Del Mar Union School District)
 Solana Highlands (Solana Beach School District)
 Solana Santa Fe (Solana Beach School District)
 Solana Pacific (Solana Beach School District)
 Solana Ranch (Solana Beach School District)
 Sycamore Ridge (Del Mar Union School District); actually in Pacific Highlands Ranch
 Torrey Hills (Del Mar Union School District); actually in Torrey Hills

Middle schools and junior high schools 
 Carmel Valley Middle School (San Dieguito Union High School District)
 Pacific Trails Middle School (San Dieguito Union High School District)
 Earl Warren Middle School (San Dieguito Union High School District); actually located in Solana Beach

K through 8 
 Notre Dame Academy (Roman Catholic)
 Del Mar Pines School (Private)

High schools 
 Torrey Pines High School (San Dieguito Union High School District)
 Canyon Crest Academy (San Dieguito Union High School District)
 Cathedral Catholic High School (Catholic)
 Westview High School (Poway Unified School District)

K through 12 
 San Diego Jewish Academy (Jewish)

Healthcare
Healthcare services in this neighborhood include:
 Scripps Clinic, Carmel Valley
 Scripps Clinic, Del Mar
 Sharp Rees-Seally
 Lindora Clinic (in Rite Aid)
 Rite Aid Pharmacy
 Vons Pharmacy
 Kaiser Permanente

Economy
The large office, retail, entertainment and academic facilities in University City a.k.a. UTC (over 9 million sq. ft. of office space),  Sorrento Mesa/Sorrento Valley (also over 9 million sq. ft.), Torrey Pines (over 2.6 million sq. ft.), and Del Mar Heights/Carmel Valley (over 4.4 million sq. ft.), together form San Diego's "North City edge city", edge city being a major center of employment outside a traditional downtown.

Companies with offices in this neighborhood include US Bank, Scripps Health, Sony, Opera Solutions, Pillsbury Winthrop Shaw Pittman, Fish & Richardson, Morrison & Foerster, Sheppard, Mullin, Richter & Hampton and The Allen Group. The headquarters of Neurocrine Biosciences and ICW Group Insurance Companies are located in this neighborhood.

Mixed-use development One Paseo had its soft opening in March 2019.

Notes

Sources

External links

 Carmel Valley community Information
 City of San Diego: Carmel Valley community profile
 Del Mar Regional Chamber of Commerce, serves Carmel Valley

 
North County (San Diego County)
Planned communities
Populated places established in 1975
1975 establishments in California
Edge cities in the San Diego metropolitan area